George William Erwau  was an Anglican bishop who served in Uganda during the early 21st-century: he was Bishop of Soroti from 6 September 2009 to 12 July.

References

21st-century Anglican bishops in Uganda
Anglican bishops of Soroti
Living people
Uganda Christian University alumni
Year of birth missing (living people)